The National Lacrosse League Goaltender of the Year Award is given annually to the best NLL goaltender of the year.

In the 2008 season, the award was sponsored by the US Navy and was known as the "US Navy Goaltender of the Year award". In the 2007 season, it was the "Progressive National Lacrosse League Goaltender of the Year Award".

Past winners

References

Goaltender